The Sigma DP1x is a large sensor digital compact camera announced by Sigma Corporation on February 20, 2010.

Software 

Sigma Photo Pro is Sigma's first-party post-processing software for RAW X3F and JPEG designed for all SIGMA digital cameras.

Actual Versions are 6.5.4 (Win 7+) and 6.5.5 (MacOSX 10.9+).

X3f files from the DP1x can also be processed in Adobe Lightroom/Photoshop and Affinity Photo.

References

http://www.dpreview.com/products/sigma/compacts/sigma_dp1x/specifications

DP1x
Cameras introduced in 2010